James Edward Hensley (born October 11, 1945) is a former NASCAR driver. With a career spanning 27 seasons in all three of NASCAR's elite divisions, Hensley may be best remembered for his Rookie of the Year award won in 1992, his 15th season in the series, and for his nine career Busch Series wins. He spent most of his career working as an oil truck driver in addition to racing. He was best known as being a substitute driver for many teams.

Early career
Hensley's NASCAR career began in 1972, driving for famous owner Junie Donlavey in the No. 90 Ford. Both of his starts that season came at Martinsville Speedway, the track being just ten miles from Hensley's hometown of Ridgeway, VA. Though an engine failure in his first start relegated Hensley to a 33rd-place finish, he completed all but seven laps of the fall event, the Old Dominion 500, to finish fifth. This would end up being Hensley's best finish in his 98 career Winston Cup Series races.

Hensley competed again for Donlavey in the 1973 and 1974 Virginia 500 events, coming home in seventh and sixth places, respectively. For the 1974 Old Dominion 500, Hensley drove the No. 02 Chevrolet owned by Russell Large, finishing 19th.  Beginning in 1975, Hensley drove the No. 63 Chevrolet for part-time owner Billy Moyer, competing in both Martinsville races each year until 1977 and registering a top ten each season. It would be last Cup race for several years.

Return to the series
In 1981, Hensley returned to the Winston Cup Series, driving in the fall Martinsville event for Cecil Gordon in the No. 24 Buick and bringing home a seventh-place result. Hensley raced in three events the next year—both Martinsville races, along with the September event at Richmond, in D. K. Ulrich's No. 40 Buick. That same year, Hensley also competed in the inaugural Busch Series season, competing in 11 events and recording four top five finishes. Hensley spent the 1983 season out of Cup and in the Busch Series, where in 29 starts, he registered 16 top ten finishes.

Busch Series
For the next eight seasons, Hensley competed on-and-off in the Winston Cup Series and raced full-time in the Busch ranks. Behind the wheel of the No. 00 Oldsmobile in 1985, Hensley came home second in points, just 29 points behind champion Jack Ingram, after a season with three wins at Hickory, South Boston, and IRP. Hensley again finished second in points in 1987 driving the No. 5 Advance Auto Parts Buick for Sam Ard, starting and finishing first in the season finale at Martinsville for his only win of the season. Just four races later, Hensley won again at Martinsville in the 1988 Miller Classic.

In 1989, Hensley drove 18 races in six different cars, recording a pole at Hickory in the No. 70 Dirt Devil Pontiac but finishing no better than sixth. In addition, he won his only career Winston Cup pole at Martinsville Speedway, filling in for Dale Earnhardt, who was unable to make it to the track at that time due to the effects of Hurricane Hugo. Earnhardt would drive the car at the race. The pole gave Hensley a berth in the 1990 Busch Clash, in which he started on the front row but fell back with mechanical issues. Hensley returned to victory lane the next season driving the No. 25 Crown Petroleum/Fast Fare Oldsmobile for Don Beverly, winning at Nazareth Speedway; he followed that up in 1991 with a career-high three victories, winning at Martinsville, Hickory, and Rougemont.

Return to the Cup Series
Hensley started the 1992 with the No. 25 Beverly Racing team, but they were unable to locate permanent sponsorship. They parted ways and Hensley moved to the Cup Series, driving the No. 66 TropArtic Ford Thunderbird for Cale Yarborough. Hensley ran in 22 races with four top-ten finishes with the group, and won Rookie of the Year honors at the age of 47, due to the other competitors that season running part-time schedules.

He began 1993 in the No. 52 NAPA/Hurley Limo Ford for Jimmy Means, running the first three races of the year. He then spent most of the season driving the No. 7 car in place of the deceased Alan Kulwicki per Kulwicki's will. After the team was bought by Geoff Bodine, he drove one race for Richard Petty before closing the season in the No. 4 Eastman Kodak/Morgan-McClure Motorsports Chevrolet.

Craftsman Truck Series participation
Beginning in 1995, Hensley began to compete in the newly formed Craftsman Truck Series, driving in his first two seasons for owner Grier Lackey. His first full season was in the No. 30 Mopar Performance Dodge Ram in 1996, where he had five top-fives and a pole position. In 1997, however, Hensley joined Petty Enterprises, piloting the No. 43 Cummins Dodge in the next three seasons.  At age 52 in 1998, Hensley found victory lane at Nashville and finished sixth in the final points standings.  The next year, he finished first at Martinsville, recording what would be the last win of his career. That year, he made his final run in the Busch Series, filling in for Wayne Grubb.

He was replaced at Petty, and signed with the No. 16 Team Rensi Motorsports Chevrolet Silverado group. With sponsorship coming from Lance Snacks, Mobile Max2, and eLink, he had eight top-ten finishes and finished thirteenth in points. He began 2001 without a ride, but ran a majority of the year filling in for Randy MacDonald in the No. 72 truck. Hensley retired after that season, and now works installing fire-service systems.

Motorsports career results

NASCAR
(key) (Bold – Pole position awarded by qualifying time. Italics – Pole position earned by points standings or practice time. * – Most laps led.)

Winston Cup Series

Daytona 500

Busch Series

Craftsman Truck Series

ARCA Talladega SuperCar Series
(key) (Bold – Pole position awarded by qualifying time. Italics – Pole position earned by points standings or practice time. * – Most laps led.)

References

External links
 
 Summary of career statistics
 Story of Hensley's 1989 Martinsville pole

Living people
1945 births
People from Henry County, Virginia
Racing drivers from Virginia
NASCAR drivers